Garie may refer to:
 Garie Beach, a surfing location in New South Wales, Australia
 Garie or Gary, a South Korean entertainer

People with the given name

See also
 Gari (disambiguation)
 Garrie (disambiguation)
 Gary (disambiguation)